Kenneth Lewis Roberts (December 8, 1885 – July 21, 1957) was an American writer of historical novels. He worked first as a journalist, becoming nationally known for his work with the Saturday Evening Post from 1919 to 1928, and then as a popular novelist. Born in Kennebunk, Maine, Roberts specialized in regionalist historical fiction, often writing about his native state and its terrain and also about other upper New England states and scenes. For example, the main characters in Arundel and Rabble in Arms are from Kennebunkport (then called Arundel), the main character in Northwest Passage is from Kittery, Maine and has friends in Portsmouth, New Hampshire, and the main character in Oliver Wiswell is from Milton, Massachusetts.

Early life
Roberts graduated in 1908 from Cornell University, where he wrote the lyrics for two Cornell fight songs, including Fight for Cornell. He was also a member of the Quill and Dagger society. He was later awarded honorary doctorates from three New England colleges: Dartmouth College, in Hanover, New Hampshire; Colby College, in Waterville, Maine; and Middlebury College, in Middlebury, Vermont.

Journalism
After graduation, Roberts spent eight years working as a newspaperman for the Boston Post. In 1917, he enlisted in the U.S. army for World War I, but he ended up as a lieutenant in the intelligence section of the American Expeditionary Force Siberia in the Russian Civil War instead of at the front in Europe. The contacts that he made in that role enabled him to become a European correspondent for the Saturday Evening Post after the war, where he became the first American journalist to cover the 1923 Beer Hall Putsch, Adolf Hitler's failed attempt to seize power. Roberts described working for the Post'''s legendary editor George Horace Lorimer as follows: "I told him my ideas, which he instantly rejected or accepted ... The price to be paid for a story was never discussed, and Lorimer was always generous."

Historical fiction

Booth Tarkington, a neighbor of Roberts in Kennebunkport, Maine, convinced him that he would never find the time to succeed as a novelist while he worked as a journalist, and Tarkington agreed to help by editing Roberts's early novels. Although Roberts continued to sell a few essays to the Post, his next few years were largely dedicated to historical fiction. Ultimately, Tarkington edited all of his historical novels through Oliver Wiswell (1940), and Roberts said in his autobiography that he offered Tarkington co-writing credit on both Northwest Passage and Oliver Wiswell in acknowledgement of Tarkington's extensive revisions to each. Both of those novels and also Rabble in Arms are dedicated to Tarkington, and Tarkington continued to assist Roberts until his death in 1946.

Roberts's historical fiction often focused on rehabilitating unpopular persons and causes in American history. A key character in Arundel and Rabble in Arms is the American officer and eventual traitor Benedict Arnold, with Roberts focusing on Arnold's expedition to Quebec and the Battle of Quebec in the first novel and the Battle of Valcour Island, the Saratoga campaign and the Battles of Saratoga in the second. Meanwhile, the hero of Northwest Passage was Major Robert Rogers and his company, Rogers' Rangers, although Rogers fought for the British during the American Revolutionary War. Oliver Wiswell focuses on a Loyalist officer during the American Revolution and covers the entire war, from famous events such as the Siege of Boston, the Battle of Bunker Hill, the New York and New Jersey campaign through the Battle of Fort Washington, and the Franco-American alliance, to less-remembered events such as the Convention Army, the exodus to Kentucky County, the Siege of Ninety-Six, and the resettlement of the United Empire Loyalists, as well as providing a later look at both a dissolute Rogers and a frustrated Arnold among the British.

George Orwell reviewed The Lively Lady in the New English Weekly in 1936, describing it as "blood-and-thundery stuff ... chiefly interesting as showing that the old-fashioned nineteenth-century type of American bumptiousness ... is still going strong."

As a result of his research into the Arnold expedition, Roberts published a work of nonfiction, March to Quebec: Journals of the Members of Arnold's Expedition, a compilation of journals and letters written by participants in the march. During Roberts's research into Major Rogers, his researcher uncovered transcripts of both of Rogers's courts-martial (once as the accuser and once as the accused), which had been thought lost for over a century, and these were published in the second volume of a special two-volume edition of Northwest Passage. He and his wife Anna translated into English the French writer Médéric Louis Élie Moreau de Saint-Méry's account of his journey through America in the 1790s. His last published work was The Battle of Cowpens, a brief history of that battle, issued after his death, in 1958.

One of Lorimer's last acts as editor of the Saturday Evening Post was to serialize Northwest Passage in 1936 and 1937. As a result of the success of the serialization, the book, when published, became the second-best-selling novel in 1937 and fifth best for the year 1938. Oliver Wiswell also spent two years in the top ten (1940 and 1941), and Lydia Bailey reached the top ten in 1947.  One of Roberts's closest friends and neighbors, the novelist A. Hamilton Gibbs, later stated that he believed that Roberts probably "wrote himself out" after Oliver Wiswell and certainly had done so after Lydia Bailey.

Key historical novels by Roberts and their topics include the following:Arundel (1929), on the American Revolution through the Battle of QuebecThe Lively Lady (1931), on the War of 1812Rabble in Arms  (1933), the sequel to Arundel, on the American Revolution through the Battles of SaratogaCaptain Caution (1934), on the War of 1812Northwest Passage (1937), on the French and Indian War and the Jonathan Carver expeditionOliver Wiswell (1940), on the American Revolution from a Loyalist's perspective, from the Siege of Boston to the United Empire LoyalistsLydia Bailey (1947), on the Haitian Revolution and the First Barbary WarBoon Island (1955), on a 1710 shipwreck on Boon Island, Maine

In 1957, two months before his death, Roberts received a Pulitzer Prize Special Citation "for his historical novels which have long contributed to the creation of greater interest in our early American history.""Special Awards and Citations". The Pulitzer Prizes. Retrieved 2013-11-02. He died, aged 71, in Kennebunkport.

Controversies
Immigration
While a reporter for the Saturday Evening Post in the early 1920s, Roberts wrote many magazine articles and a book during the period immediately following World War I that urged strong legal restrictions on immigration from eastern and southern Europe and from Mexico, warning of the dangers of immigration from places other than northwestern Europe. He became a leading voice for stricter immigration laws and testified before a congressional committee on the subject. He wrote:

“If America doesn’t keep out the queer alien mongrelized people of Southern and Eastern Europe, her crop of citizens will eventually be dwarfed and mongrelized in turn.”

In Why Europe Leaves Home, derived from his Post articles, Roberts further referred to Jews as "human parasites" and was separately quoted warning against further "Semitic" immigration to America, which he feared would turn the U.S. population into a "worthless and futile" hybrid race.

Florida land boom
Three of Roberts's first books were written at least in part to promote the Florida land boom of the 1920s. They were Sun Hunting (1922), Florida Loafing (1925), and Florida (1926). Many people lost a lot of money in the bust that followed. These books were usually omitted from the lists of “other books by this author” published in the front pages of his later works.

Dowsing
In the 1940s, Roberts became acquainted with Henry Gross, a retired Maine game warden and amateur water dowser. He and Gross began a long association to use Gross's claimed dowsing abilities to find deposits of water, petroleum, uranium, and diamonds, through a corporation named Water Unlimited, Inc. Roberts documented his experiences in three nonfiction books that were popular successes but received much criticism from the scientific community. He joked that he should have given The Seventh Sense the subtitle Or How to Lose Friends and Alienate People.Maine cooking
When Roberts was working on Trending Into Maine, he published a chapter in the Saturday Evening Post which was dedicated to dishes he remembered having as a boy growing up in Maine. Several months after the chapter was published he began to receive mail from residents and ex-residents who were troubled that he neglected to mention many of the dishes they knew and loved from the Pine Tree State. Roberts was distressed by the letters but decided to keep them, and they were eventually compiled by his secretary, Marjorie Mosser, and eventually included in the cookbook Good Maine Food, which was first published in 1939. Roberts wrote the introduction to the book and a chapter on diet.

BooksEurope's Morning After (1921), a collection of Saturday Evening Post essaysWhy Europe Leaves Home (1922), a collection of Saturday Evening Post essays on immigrationSun Hunting: Adventures and Observations among the Native and Migratory Tribes of Florida (1922), humorous essays, Florida promotionBlack Magic (1924), a collection of Saturday Evening Post essaysConcentrated New England: A Sketch of Calvin Coolidge (1924), an informal biographyFlorida Loafing (1925), humorous essays, Florida promotionFlorida (1926), Florida promotionArundel (1929), a historical novelThe Lively Lady (1931), a historical novel (see Dartmoor Prison)Rabble in Arms  (1933), a historical novelCaptain Caution (1934), a historical novelFor Authors Only, and Other Gloomy Essays (1935), humorous essaysIt Must Be Your Tonsils (1936), humorous essaysNorthwest Passage (1937), a historical novelMarch to Quebec (1938), a historical compilationTrending into Maine (1938), a travelogueOliver Wiswell (1940), a historical novelThe Kenneth Roberts Reader (1945), a compilation of his worksLydia Bailey (1947), a historical novelMoreau de St.-Mery's American Journey 1793–1798 (1947), English translation, with Anna M. Roberts) -- historyI Wanted to Write (1949), autobiographyHenry Gross and his Dowsing Rod (1951), on dowsingThe Seventh Sense (1953), on dowsingBoon Island (1955), a historical novelWater Unlimited (1957), on dowsingThe Battle of Cowpens (1958), a historical essayArundel, The Lively Lady, Captain Caution and Northwest Passage were published as Armed Services Editions during WWII.

See also
Marie de Sabrevois

 

References

Other sources

"Kenneth Roberts". Dictionary of Literary Biography 9:313–318 (1981).
Bales, Jack (1989). Kenneth Roberts: The Man and His Works. Metuchen, N.J.: Scarecrow Press.
Bales, Jack (1993). Kenneth Roberts. Twayne's United States Authors Series. New York: Twayne Publishers.
Harris, Janet (1976). A Century of American History in Fiction: Kenneth Roberts' Novels. Gordon Press.
Whitman, Sylvia (January 1992). "The West of a Down Easterner: Kenneth Roberts and the Saturday Evening Post, 1924–1928". Journal of the West''.

External links
 
 
 
 
 The Papers of Kenneth Roberts at Dartmouth College Library

1885 births
1957 deaths
20th-century American novelists
American historical novelists
American male novelists
Cornell University alumni
Dowsing
Parapsychologists
People from Kennebunk, Maine
People from Kennebunkport, Maine
Pulitzer Prize winners
United States Army officers
Novelists from Maine
20th-century American male writers
American military personnel of the Russian Civil War
United States Army personnel of World War I
The Boston Post people
Members of the American Academy of Arts and Letters